Salve Regina University competes on the NCAA Division III level and is a member of the Commonwealth Coast Conference (CCC) and Commonwealth Coast Football (CCC Football). The university offers ten varsity sports for women (soccer, field hockey, tennis, cross country, basketball, ice hockey, volleyball, softball, track and field, and lacrosse), eight for men (football, cross country, soccer, basketball, ice hockey, tennis, baseball, and lacrosse), and one co-ed sport (sailing). Sailing is governed by the Inter-Collegiate Sailing Association (ICSA), and its subdivision, the New England Intercollegiate Sailing Association (NEISA).
The school also offers men's and women's rugby, governed by the Colonial Coast Rugby Conference, USA Rugby and the International Rugby Board (IRB).  The men's rugby program competes at the Division III level, and the women's program competes on the Division III level in the National Small College Rugby Organization (NSCRO).

The university mascot is the Seahawk.

History
Over the last eight seasons, the men's rugby team and the women's basketball team have enjoyed the greatest success, earning 8 conference championships, and 1 runner-up finishes in that time frame.  In addition, the men's rugby, women's basketball, men's basketball, men's tennis, men’s hockey and sailing teams have all competed in national collegiate championship tournaments.

Although the sport does not permit easy comparisons with more traditional sports, the sailing team (co-ed) has been very successful against national powerhouse sailing programs.

Conferences and opponents
The Commonwealth Coast Conference (CCC) governs eight varsity sports for women (soccer, field hockey, tennis, cross country, basketball, volleyball, softball, and lacrosse) and eight for men (cross country, soccer, basketball, ice hockey, tennis, baseball, golf and lacrosse). The Conference will add football as a conference sport in 2017-18. Conference opponents include Curry, Eastern Nazarene, Gordon, Nichols, Endicott, Roger Williams, University of New England, Wentworth and Western New England College.

Sailing at SRU is governed by the Intercollegiate Sailing Association (ICSA), and its subdivision, the New England Intercollegiate Sailing Association.

In 2012 the Rugby teams moved into the newly formed Colonial Coast Rugby Conference, where the men and women compete nationally at the National Small College Rugby Organization (Division III). The Salve Regina Men’s Rugby team won the national championship in Spring 2012.

Notable alumni
Damian Costantino, (baseball) NCAA record holder with hits in 60 consecutive games.

References

External links
 

 
Salve Regina University
New England Hockey Conference teams